

Open Source Question and Answer, or OSQA, was an open source question-answer system written in Python with Django. The data layer relies on MySQL, PostgreSQL, Microsoft SQL Server or SQLite.

OSQA is free software released under the GNU GPL v3+.

It has been reported as unmaintained.

See also
 Askbot
 Q&A software
 Stack Overflow

References

External links
 

Free software programmed in Python
Knowledge markets